Azes II (Greek:  , epigraphically  ; Kharosthi:), may have been the last Indo-Scythian king, speculated to have reigned circa 35–12 BCE, in the northern Indian subcontinent (modern day Pakistan). His existence has been questioned; if he did not exist, artefacts attributed to his reign, such as coins, are likely to be those of Azes I.

After the death of Azes II, the rule of the Indo-Scythians in northwestern India and Pakistan finally crumbled with the conquest of the Kushans, one of the five tribes of the Yuezhi who had lived in Bactria for more than a century, and who were then expanding into India to create a Kushan Empire. Soon after, the Parthians invaded from the west. Their leader Gondophares temporarily displaced the Kushans and founded the Indo-Parthian Kingdom that was to last until the middle of the 1st century CE. The Kushans ultimately regained northwestern India circa 75 CE, where they were to prosper for several centuries.

Name
Azes's name is attested on his coins in the Greek form  and the Kharosthi form , which are both derived from the Saka name , meaning "leader".

Buddhist dedications

Bimaran casket

Azes II is also connected to the Bimaran casket, one of the earliest representations of the Buddha. The casket was part of the deposit of Stupa 2 in Bimaran, near Jalalabad in Afghanistan, and placed inside the stupa with several coins of Azes II. This event may have happened during the reign of Azes (35–12 BCE), or slightly later. The Indo-Scythians are otherwise connected with Buddhism (see Mathura lion capital and the multiple Buddhist dedications of the Apracas), and it is indeed possible they would have commended the work. However it now thought that a later king, issuing coins in the name of Azes, such as Kharahostes, made the dedication.

Butkhara stupa

A coin of Azes II was found under a pillar with an Indo-Corinthian capital and sculpture of a Buddhist devotee in the Butkara Stupa, suggesting the involvement of Azes II in Buddhist dedications, and a datation for the sculpture corresponding to the reign of Azes II.

Coinage
Coins attributed to Azes II use Greek and Kharoshti inscriptions, depict a Greek goddess as his protector, and thereby essentially follow the numismatic model of the Greek kings of the Indo-Greek kingdom, suggesting a high willingness to accommodate Greek culture. A novel difference of the Indo-Scythians was to show the king on a horse, rather than his bust in profile as did the Greeks.

Other coins of Azes depict the Buddhist lion and the Brahmanic cow of Shiva, suggesting religious tolerance towards his subjects. In the coin depicted to the left Azes is depicted with the inscriptions:

Obv: King with coat of mail, on horse, holding a sceptre, with Greek royal headband. Greek legend ΒΑΣΙΛΕΩΣ ΒΑΣΙΛΕΩΝ ΜΕΓΑΛΟΥ ΑΖΟΥ "The Great King of Kings Azes".
Rev: Athena with shield and lance, making a hand gesture identical to the Buddhist vitarka mudra. Kharoshti legend MAHARAJASA RAJADIRAJASA MAHATASA AYASA "The Great King of Kings Azes", with the Buddhist triratna symbol in the left field.

Azes II was long believed to have issued several of the Indo-Scythian coins struck under the name Azes in northern India. All these coins were however likely issued by a single ruler named Azes, as suggested by Robert Senior, when he found an overstrike of a coin attributed to Azes I over a coin attributed to Azes II, suggesting that all the "Azes II" coins were not later than those of "Azes I" and that there was only one king in the dynasty named Azes. This idea had long been advocated by Senior with a number of indirect numismatic arguments, for instance in his encyclopaedia of Indo-Scythian coins.

Coin gallery

See also
Ahir
Ancient India and Central Asia
Greco-Bactrian Kingdom
Indo-Greek Kingdom
Indo-Parthian Kingdom
Kushan Empire
Tillia tepe
Yuezhi

Footnotes

References
 The Shape of Ancient Thought. Comparative studies in Greek and Indian Philosophies by Thomas McEvilley (Allworth Press and the School of Visual Arts, 2002) 
 The Greeks in Bactria and India, W. W. Tarn, Cambridge University Press.

External links
 Coins of Azes II
 Coins of Azes II on wildwinds.com

Indo-Scythian kings
12 BC deaths
1st-century BC Iranian monarchs
Year of birth unknown
1st-century BC Iranian people